Xingqing Prefecture was a prefecture in imperial China between the 11th and 13th centuries in modern Ningxia, China, centering on modern Yinchuan. 

It was the capital of Western Xia and its de facto independent precursor Dingnan Jiedushi. The Mongol leader and conqueror Genghis Khan, who founded the Mongol Empire, died there on 25 August 1227.

Xingqing was its name between 1033 and 1205. Between 1205 and 1288, it was known as Zhongxing Prefecture (Chinese: Zhōngxīngfǔ 中興府;) and between 1020 and 1033 as Xing Prefecture (Chinese: Xīngzhōu 興州;).

The modern urban district Xingqing District in Yinchuan retains its name.

References

 

1020 establishments in Asia
11th-century establishments in China
1288 disestablishments in Asia
13th-century disestablishments in China
Prefectures of Western Xia
Prefectures of the Yuan dynasty
Yinchuan
Former prefectures in Ningxia